Aïn Soltane is a town and commune of Aïn Defla Province, Algeria.

Communes of Aïn Defla Province